Othneil Downes (1 September 1934 – 25 April 2000) was a Barbadian cricketer. He played in four first-class matches for the Barbados cricket team in 1958/59.

See also
 List of Barbadian representative cricketers

References

External links
 

1934 births
2000 deaths
Barbadian cricketers
Barbados cricketers
People from Saint Michael, Barbados